Extreme Loading for Structures (ELS) is commercial structural-analysis software based on the applied element method (AEM) for the automatic tracking and propagation of cracks, separation of elements, element collision, and collapse of structures under extreme loads. AEM combines features of Finite element method and Discrete element method simulation with its own solver capabilities for the generation of PC-based structural analysis.

History

2003
 Research and development related to the software begins with the formation of Applied Science International. The first release of ELS appears in the form of 2D analysis with structures modeled, loading scenarios applied, and results viewed.

2008
 Version 2.0 allows users to perform 3D analysis, though modeling is largely limited to 2D and restricted 3D functionality.
 The United States Department of Homeland Security assigns ELS Designation Status for Anti-terrorism under the SAFETY Act.

2009
 ELS version 3.0 is released with complete 3D functionality.

See also
Failure analysis
Physics engine
Structural engineering
Earthquake simulation
Applied Element Method

Academic institutions
More than 20 universities and academic institutions are currently involved in research and development projects resulting in the creation of publications on topics related to the Applied Element Method and Extreme Loading for Structures.  Academic institutions working with ELS include:

References

External links 
 Applied Element Method
 Extreme Loading for Structures
 Applied Science International, LLC

Scientific simulation software
Numerical software
Computer-aided engineering software